Crimthann, Cremthann or in Modern Irish Criofan, is a masculine Irish given name meaning fox. Notable people with the name include:

Crimthann mac Fidaig, legendary High King of Ireland of the 4th century AD
Crimthann Nia Náir, legendary High King of Ireland of the 1st century AD
Crimthann Coscrach, legendary High King of Ireland of the 3rd century BC
Crimthann mac Énnai, 5th century AD King of Leinster
Crimthann mac Áedo, 7th century AD King of Leinster
Crimthann Srem mac Echado, 6th century AD King of Munster

Irish-language masculine given names